Stefan Max Hirniak (born February 5, 1985) is a swimmer from Canada, who mostly competes in the freestyle and butterfly events. He claimed a bronze medal (4 × 200 m freestyle relay) at the 2007 Pan American Games in Rio de Janeiro, Brazil.

At the 2010 Commonwealth Games in Delhi Hirniak won bronze in the 200 m butterfly during the first day of competition.

See also
 World record progression 4 × 200 metres freestyle relay

References

External links
Profile Canadian Olympic Committee

1985 births
Living people
Canadian male butterfly swimmers
Canadian male freestyle swimmers
Sportspeople from New Brunswick, New Jersey
Virginia Cavaliers men's swimmers
World record setters in swimming
Commonwealth Games medallists in swimming
Commonwealth Games bronze medallists for Canada
Pan American Games bronze medalists for Canada
Swimmers at the 2007 Pan American Games
Swimmers at the 2010 Commonwealth Games
Pan American Games medalists in swimming
Medalists at the 2007 Pan American Games
20th-century Canadian people
21st-century Canadian people
Medallists at the 2010 Commonwealth Games